Burnt Island is a small, uninhabited island in the Isles of Scilly, Cornwall, United Kingdom. It is covered in thrift and long grasses. and is linked to the island of St Agnes at low tide. It is approximately 150 metres long and 125 metres wide and is oblong in shape.

As of 2014, Burnt Island had a geocache.

References 

Uninhabited islands of the Isles of Scilly